Trevor Morris (born 25 May 1970) is a Canadian orchestral composer and music producer. His scores include the television shows The Tudors,  The Pillars of the Earth, The Borgias, and Vikings; the film Olympus Has Fallen and its sequel London Has Fallen; and the video game Dragon Age: Inquisition. He was nominated for an Emmy for Outstanding Original Main Title Theme Music for his score for The Borgias and for Outstanding Music Composition for a Miniseries, Movie or A Special (Original Dramatic Score) for his score for The Pillars of the Earth.

Life and work
Morris was born in London, Ontario, Canada, 2 hours west of Toronto. He was accepted to St. Mary's school for the arts as a child, where he studied violin and choir daily. At age 13, Morris was commissioned by his school to compose a piece for his graduating class to perform in honor of the Pope John Paul II's visit to Canada. His fee was $50. Beloved Young People, a book authored by the Pope aimed at the youth of the generation became the source for adapted lyrics, and Trevor's senior class performed his composition for Piano and 4-part Choir at St. Mary's cathedral at graduation. It was a defining moment that would shape Trevor's future.

At college Morris attended, Fanshawe College's "Music Industry Arts" program. He graduated top of his class and upon graduation immediately moved to Toronto to start work. He spent his 20s in the music production circles of Toronto but eventually turned his attention away from production and over to composing full-time music for television commercials. Wanting a longer format for his music ideas, Morris moved towards scoring films and television series and in 1999 he moved to Los Angeles to follow this new career angle. During his early years in Los Angeles, Morris worked with famous score composers, James Newton Howard and Hans Zimmer. As part of Zimmer's team, Morris amassed over 25 major screen credits on some of Hollywood's block busters.

As Morris' own career in composition developed, so did the opportunity to directly collaborate with others such as Jerry Bruckheimer, Neil Jordan and Tony and Ridley Scott. In 2007 Morris received the EMMY award for best music composition for a television series main title for The Tudors. 2010 marked Morris' fourth television collaboration with Jerry Bruckheimer and his team. Morris also completed the mini-series The Pillars of the Earth with Tony and Ridley Scott producing. Morris has worked as composer on a number of video games including SimCity Societies, Army of Two, Need for Speed: Carbon and most recently, for the epic third installment of the Dragon Age series by BioWare, Dragon Age: Inquisition as well as films such as The Hills Have Eyes 2, and The Marine 2. He produced the score for the 2013 film Olympus Has Fallen.

Morris maintains a production company in Toronto with his partners. He currently lives and works in Los Angeles with his family.

Discography

Films

Television

Video games

Awards

References

External links

Trevor Morris: Composer
Interview with Trevor Morris (The Daily Film Music Blog)
Borgias official website at Bravo!

1970 births
Canadian electronic musicians
Canadian film score composers
Canadian record producers
Canadian television composers
Fanshawe College alumni
Living people
Male film score composers
Male television composers
Musicians from London, Ontario
Video game composers